Rieux is a commune in the Seine-Maritime department in the Normandy region in northern France.

Geography

Heraldry

Population

Places of interest
 The church of St. Martin & St. Barthélemy, dating from the sixteenth century.
 A fifteenth century brick-built manorhouse.

See also
Communes of the Seine-Maritime department

References

Communes of Seine-Maritime